88 Greenwich Street, also known as the Greenwich Club Residences and previously as 19 Rector Street, is a building on the south side of Rector Street between Greenwich and Washington Streets in the Financial District of Manhattan in New York City. Built in 1929–30, the 37-story building was designed by Lafayette A. Goldstone and Alexander Zamshnick in the Art Deco style.

An entrance to the New York City Subway's Rector Street station was in the basement of the building, and opened in 1931. This entrance had closed by 1941.

88 Greenwich Street was added to the National Register of Historic Places in 2002.  The building was renovated into residential condominium use in 2006. In 2012, the building was affected by flooding from Hurricane Sandy. Three million cubic feet of salt water entered the basement of the building, causing significant damage. During the flooding, water dislodged an oil tank, which cracked after hitting a ceiling beam.

See also
 Art Deco architecture of New York City
 National Register of Historic Places listings in Manhattan below 14th Street

References
Notes

External links
 
 Official website
 88 Greenwich Street on CTBUH
 88 Greenwich Street on Emporis
 88 Greenwich Street on Skyscraperpage.com

Residential buildings on the National Register of Historic Places in Manhattan
Residential buildings completed in 1931
Residential condominiums in New York City
Art Deco architecture in Manhattan
Residential skyscrapers in Manhattan
Condominiums and housing cooperatives in Manhattan
Financial District, Manhattan